Halina Matysiak Grabowski (29 January 1928–23 April 2003) was a member of the Polish resistance movement in World War II. At the age of 16 she fought in the Warsaw Uprising against the German occupation of Warsaw.

Life
Halina Grabowski was born on 29 January 1928, in Warsaw. Aged 16, she served as a nurse, messenger and combatant in the Warsaw Uprising. She was wounded, and became a prisoner of war.

She met her husband, George Grabowski, in Germany and married him in England on 2 October 1948. In 1952 they moved to Cleveland, Ohio. She died on 23 April 2003, in Independence, Ohio.

Grabowski was awarded four medals by the Polish Government at a ceremony in Cleveland.  She was also awarded the Armia Krajowa Cross.

References

External links
 Mike DeWine, Tribute to Halina Grabowski, August 1, 2003

1928 births
2003 deaths
Warsaw Uprising insurgents
Polish female soldiers
Polish prisoners of war in World War II
Polish emigrants to the United States
Recipients of the Armia Krajowa Cross